Darza is a village in the municipality of Ulcinj, southeastern Montenegro. It is a multi-ethnic settlement, inhabited by Montenegrins, Serbs and Albanians.

Demographics
According to the 2003 census, the total population was 119.

According to the 2011 census, its population was 135.

Demographic history

According to mother tongue, the 2011 census recorded 82 Serbian-speakers, 43 Albanian-speakers, and 10 Montenegrin-speakers.

According to religion, the 2011 census recorded 85 Orthodox Christians, 32 Muslims and 16 Catholics.

References

Populated places in Ulcinj Municipality
Albanian communities in Montenegro